Bušovce (German: Buschendorf) is a village and municipality in Kežmarok District in the Prešov Region of northern central Slovakia.

Geography
The municipality lies at an altitude of 593 meters and covers an area of 9.03 km2.
It has a population of 306 people (as of 31 December 2015).

History
In historical records the village was first mentioned in 1286.

Economy and infrastructure
Most important sights to see are the evangelical neo gothic and Roman Catholic gothic churches and a baroque manor house.

Genealogical resources
The records for genealogical research are available at the state archive Statny Archiv in Levoca, Slovakia.
 Roman Catholic church records (births/marriages/deaths): 1673-1899 (parish A)
 Greek Catholic church records (births/marriages/deaths): 1822-1925 (parish B)

See also
 List of municipalities and towns in Slovakia

References

External links

Surnames of living people in Busovce

Villages and municipalities in Kežmarok District